Hisar-i Shadman (Ḥeşar-e Šadman) refers to the ancient territory of Šuman, lying north of the Oxus, between the Zamel and the Qobazian rivers, which are tributaries of the Oxus. It is located it what was known as Transoxiana. Ismail I was granted a letter of appointment to the governorship of Hisari Shadman (c. 1510) after his famous victory at Merv. Muhammad Babur Mirza was also said to have retreated to Hisari Shadman when he was unable to maintain his position against the Uzbeg sultans.

References

 Hill, Margari Aziza. "Half the World." Stanford University, School of Education Bldg. Stanford, 9 Mar. 2007.
 Beg Monshi, Eskandar. History of Shah 'Abbas the Great.Vol. 1. Boulder, CO: Westview Press, 1978.
 Dale, Stephen and Alam Payind. "The Ahrari Waqf in Kabul in the Year 1546 and the Mughul Naqshbandiyyah". Journal of the American Oriental Society Vol. 119 (1999): 218-223.

Safavid Iran
Central Asia